The Two Penny Blue or The Two Pence Blue was the world's second official postage stamp, produced in the United Kingdom of Great Britain and Ireland and issued after the Penny Black.

Initial printing took place from 1 May 1840, and in all 6,460,000 were printed from two plates until 29 August. Officially the stamps were valid for postage from 6 May but were only available from 8 May. It was first sold to the public at the London Inland revenue office on 6 May 1840. Except for its denomination, the design is exactly the same as the penny black and was struck from the same die.

It was originally intended that the 2d blue be issued at the same time as the 1d black; the earliest postmark seen on one of these is 6 May 1840. The first issues of this value (intended for double rate letters), were printed from plates 1 and 2. The printing plates were destroyed in 1843. Copies of the stamp are now significantly rarer and more expensive than the Penny Black.

Later when the colours of the stamps were being revised, the inks chosen were red-brown for the penny value and a new blue ink for the two pence value. As the printed stamps in the new ink looked the same as the original issue, it was decided to add a horizontal line at the top and bottom of the label so as the newer printings could be easily identified. Printing of the revised stamps began on 27 February 1841 and were placed on sale in March. These are referred to as the white lines added issue, as pictured right. They are more common than the original 1840 printing.

The Penny Black allowed a letter weighing up to half an ounce to be sent anywhere within Britain; the Two Penny Blue's weight limit was a full ounce.

See also
 Penny Black
 Penny Blue
 Penny Red
 VR official
 List of British postage stamps

References

External links
Images of the Two penny blue from the Phillips Collection at the British Postal History Museum

1840 works
1840 establishments in the United Kingdom
Postage stamps of the United Kingdom
Postal history of the United Kingdom
Cultural depictions of Queen Victoria